Rajat Suresh Paliwal (born 24 December 1991) is an Indian cricketer who plays for Services in domestic cricket. He is a right-hand batsman and an occasional right arm off-break bowler.

He was the leading run-scorer for Haryana in the 2017–18 Ranji Trophy, with 380 runs in six matches. He was the leading run-scorer for Services in the 2018–19 Vijay Hazare Trophy, with 336 runs in eight matches.

Ahead of the 2018–19 Ranji Trophy, he transferred from Haryana to Services. He was the leading run-scorer for Services in the tournament, with 652 runs in nine matches.

References

External links 

Rajat Paliwal's profile page on Wisden

Indian cricketers
Services cricketers
North Zone cricketers
Living people
1991 births
People from Sonipat
India Green cricketers
Cricketers from Haryana
Haryana cricketers